Latham's francolin (Peliperdix lathami) or the forest francolin, is a species of bird in the francolin group of the family Phasianidae. It is the only member of the monotypic genus Peliperdix. It is found in Angola, Cameroon, Central African Republic, Republic of the Congo, Democratic Republic of the Congo, Ivory Coast, Equatorial Guinea, Gabon, Ghana, Guinea, Liberia, Nigeria, Sierra Leone, South Sudan, Tanzania, Togo, and Uganda.

References

Latham's francolin
Birds of West Africa
Birds of Central Africa
Latham's francolin
Taxonomy articles created by Polbot